Power FM is the former name of Capital South Coast, a regional radio station in South Hampshire, England, UK.

Power FM may also refer to:

Power FM (radio network), a radio network in Australia
Power FM (Bulgaria) - Bulgarian radio station in Bulgaria
Power FM 89.2, a defunct radio station in Jakarta, Indonesia
Power FM 98.1, a radio station in New South Wales, Australia
Power FM 102.5, a radio station in New South Wales, Australia
Power FM 103.1, a radio station in Ballarat, Victoria, Australia
Power FM (South Australia), a radio station in South Australia, Australia
Power FM (South Africa), a radio station in Gauteng, South Africa
Power FM Canary Islands, a radio station in the Canary Islands
KAWA (FM) (Power FM), a radio station in Dallas, Texas, United States